Winterthorne is a soap opera web series that premiered on August 27, 2015. Starring Martha Madison as Miranda Winterthorne, the ruthless matriarch of a candy dynasty, the series was created, written and executive produced by Michael Caruso. Caruso previously created the web soap DeVanity, which ran from 2011 to 2014.

In 2016, Winterthorne received a Daytime Emmy Award nomination for Outstanding Digital Daytime Drama Series. Kathleen Gati was nominated for Outstanding Actress in a Digital Daytime Drama Series for her portrayal of Valentina Winterthorne, and Kevin Spirtas was nominated for Outstanding Actor in a Digital Daytime Drama Series for playing Dominic Delacort. The series has also won several Indie Series Awards.

Plot
Miranda is the cold, ruthless head of the Winterthorne candy empire. Her marriage is in shambles, she is estranged from her son and their lives are all in danger. But it was not always this way. A decade earlier, naive Miranda's eyes were opened to her family's best kept secrets, and their violent treachery. Her only means to secure the survival of her loved ones and her livelihood has been to embrace the dark, cruel and murderous heart of a Winterthorne.

Cast

Main
 Martha Madison as Miranda Winterthorne
 Michael Caruso as Victor Winterthorne, Miranda's husband
 Gordon Thomson as Maxmillian Winterthorne, Miranda's father
 Josh Thrower as Colin Winterthorne, Miranda and Victor's son
 Kevin Spirtas as Dominic Delacort, the trainer of Winterthorne men
 John-Paul Lavoisier as Hugh Cambridge, Miranda's former fiancé

Guest
 Linda Gray as Joanna Winterthorne, Miranda's mother
 Kathleen Gati as Valentina Winterthorne, Miranda's aunt and Joanna's sister
 Kirsten Storms as Selene Winterthorne, Miranda's sister
 Ron Hanks as Jelly Bean Jim, Dominic's son
 Conrad Bluth as Young Colin

Concept
Taking place over a 10-year time span, the first season of Winterthorne chronicles the rise of Miranda as the leader of the Winterthorne candy dynasty, with "a modern storyline that runs parallel with flashbacks". Jamey Giddens of Daytime Confidential described the series as "a story about smartly-dressed, witch-like beings who use 'nature' to create candy so addictive it leads to a multi-million dollar empire and men groveling at their feet". Of the candy empire concept, Caruso said, "I thought it would be fun to take something very innocent and happy on the surface and add a very dark undercurrent to it, and kind of create a family that used something like this as a front for something much deeper and scarier." He noted, "There is something in the candy, and that’s really the core of this show." Caruso added:

Setting up the first season, Caruso explained that the Winterthorne family has "reached a crossroads ... Martha's complicated character, Miranda, is taking over, and we'll see over the course of four episodes where she started from and some of the good and not-so-good choices she's made in order to control her family."

Casting and production
Having previously created the web soap DeVanity (2011–14), Caruso announced Winterthorne in November 2014, describing the series as "a classic soap with light touches of gothic whimsy" that would be "dark, sexy, glamorous, and a visual feast". Madison had been cast in the lead role of Miranda Winterthorne, ruthless leader of a candy empire, with Thomson as Miranda's father Maxmillian and Caruso himself set to play her husband Victor. With production scheduled to begin in Spring 2015, Caruso also announced the addition of director Sonia Blangiardo, who had previously won a Daytime Emmy Award as a director for As the World Turns and another as a producer for One Life to Live.

In February 2015, it was announced that Gray had been cast as Miranda's mother, Joanna Winterthorne. Caruso said of Gray, "Her character is so important, and really sets everything in motion for, not only the season, but the rest of the series." He noted, "Linda has a warmth and strength that embodies Joanna ... [I] wrote this part specifically for her." Next cast were Gati as Joanna's powerhungry sister Valentina, and Storms as Miranda's estranged sister Selene. Spirtas and Lavoisier were later added to the cast as Hugh Cambridge and Dominic Delacort respectively, and Ron Hanks as Jelly Bean Jim.

An April 2015 Indiegogo crowdfunding campaign partially funded season 1 of Winterthorne. The series is executive produced by Caruso and his wife Barbara "Barbi" Caruso, with Steve Silverman of Suchagooddog LLC, Jim Cannella and Martha Madison as co-executive producers. The series began a three-week production schedule in late March 2015 in the Los Angeles area. Some of Winterthorne was shot on location in Idyllwild (near Palm Springs, California).

Episodes

Broadcast and reception
A trailer for Winterthorne was released May 2015, with an extended version following in July 2015. The series had a red carpet premiere at the Renberg Theater in Los Angeles on August 16, 2015. Billed as a "four-part online event", the series debuted at Winterthorne.com on August 27, 2015. The remaining three episodes of season 1 were released weekly on Fridays, starting September 4, 2015.

In May 2015, Luke Kerr of Daytime Confidential wrote that the initial preview trailer featured "big screen production values (we expect nothing less from Caruso & Co.), fantastic fashion, epic drama and a drizzle of Pushing Daisies-style mythology". Calling the series "highly anticipated", Michael Fairman noted, "The sweeping epic look, and the fantastical images and costumes have become staples of Caruso’s work, and this series looks to be where all those production values come together in the most spectacular way." Daytime Confidential Jamey Giddens wrote of the extended trailer, "My blood sugar has gone straight through the stratosphere after just a sampling of the delicious, high calorie confections creator and star Michael Caruso (DeVanity) is offering up in his new soap opera Winterthorne." Giddens later wrote of the first episode, "Produced on a shoe-string budget, Winterthorne boasts cinematography, establishing shots, scene and wardrobe design that puts every current daytime soap airing to shame, with the exception of The Bold and the Beautiful. Winterthorne also brings it where it matters most to soap fans—in the story department." Kevin Mulcahy Jr. of We Love Soaps wrote of episode two, "A compelling script, beautiful scenery, gorgeous clothes and soap stars galore make for fun viewing on any screen. But beware of deadly licorice!"

Awards and nominations
In 2016, Winterthorne received a Daytime Emmy Award nomination for Outstanding Digital Daytime Drama Series. Kathleen Gati was nominated for Outstanding Actress in a Digital Daytime Drama Series for her portrayal of Valentina Winterthorne, and Kevin Spirtas was nominated for Outstanding Actor in a Digital Daytime Drama Series for playing Dominic Delacort.

The series received a record-tying 13 Indie Series Award nominations, and won three.

References

External links
 
 
 
Media
 
 
 
 
 
 
 

2015 web series debuts
2015 web series endings
2010s American drama television series
American drama web series
Internet soap operas